Peacock Sound is an ice-filled sound,  long and  wide, separating Thurston Island from the Eights Coast of Ellsworth Land in Antarctica. The sound is occupied by the western part of the Abbot Ice Shelf, and is therefore not navigable by ships.

The feature was discovered by members of the United States Antarctic Program in flights from the ship USS Bear in February 1940, and was further delineated from air photos taken by US Navy Operation HIGHJUMP in December 1946. The sound was first noted to parallel the entire south coast of Thurston Island, thereby establishing insularity, by the USN Bellingshausen Sea Expedition in February 1960. Named after the sloop-of-war USS Peacock in which Captain William L. Hudson, in company with the tender USS Flying Fish under Lt. William M. Walker, both of the United States Exploring Expedition, 1838–42, sailed along the edge of the pack ice to the north of Thurston Island for several days in March 1839.

Further reading 
 Defense Mapping Agency  1992, Sailing Directions (planning Guide) and (enroute) for Antarctica, P 382
  Andrew J. Hund, Antarctica and the Arctic Circle: A Geographic Encyclopedia of the Earth's Polar Regions, P 374
 M.J. Hambrey, P.F. Barker, P.J. Barrett, V. Bowman, B. Davies, J.L. Smellie, M. Trantern, Antarctic Palaeoenvironments and Earth-Surface Processes, P 242
  Gohl, K. (2010): Tectonics and ice sheet dynamics of West Antarctic margins, EGU General Assembly, ViennaMay .
  Gohl, K., D. Teterin, G. Eagles, G. Netzeband, J. W. G. Grobys, N. Parsiegla, P. Schlüter, V. Leinweber, R. D. Larter, G. UenzelmannNeben, and G. B. Udintsev (2007), Geophysical survey reveals tectonic structures in the Amundsen Sea embayment, West Antarctica, in Antarctica: A Keystone in a Changing World – Online Proceedings of the 10th ISAES, edited by A. K. Cooper and C. R. Raymond et al., USGS Open-File Report 2007–1047, Short Research Paper 047, 4 p.; doi:10.3133/of2007-1047.srp047
 Katharina Hochmuth and Karsten Gohl, Glaciomarine sedimentation dynamics of the Abbot glacial trough of the Amundsen Sea Embayment shelf, West Antarctica, Geological Society, London, Special Publications, 381, 233–244, 24 July 2013, https://doi.org/10.1144/SP381.21

External links 
 Peacock Sound on USGS website
 Peacock Sound on SCAR website
 Peacock Sound on marineregions website
 Peacock Sound distance calculator
 Long term updated weather forecast for Peacock Sound

References 
 

Sounds of Antarctica
Bodies of water of Ellsworth Land